Lindendorf is a municipality in the district Märkisch-Oderland, in Brandenburg, Germany.

Demography

References

External links

Localities in Märkisch-Oderland